The Huslia River is a  tributary of the Koyukuk River in the U.S. state of Alaska. The river begins at the confluence of its north and south forks and flows generally southeast across the Koyukuk National Wildlife Refuge to meet the larger river near the community of Huslia.

See also
List of rivers of Alaska

References

External links
Koyukuk National Wildlife Refuge – U.S. Fish and Wildlife Service

Rivers of Alaska
Rivers of Yukon–Koyukuk Census Area, Alaska
Tributaries of the Yukon River
Rivers of Unorganized Borough, Alaska